The Democratic People's Republic of Korea (North Korea) conducted its sixth (and most recent to date) nuclear test on 3 September 2017, stating it had tested a thermonuclear weapon (hydrogen bomb). The United States Geological Survey reported an earthquake of 6.3-magnitude not far from North Korea's Punggye-ri nuclear test site. South Korean authorities said the earthquake seemed to be artificial, consistent with an underground nuclear test. The USGS, as well as China Earthquake Networks Center, reported that the initial event was followed by a second, smaller, earthquake at the site, several minutes later, which was characterized as a collapse of the cavity formed by the initial detonation.

Nuclear device 

The North Korean government announced that it had detonated a hydrogen (thermonuclear) bomb that could be loaded onto an intercontinental ballistic missile (ICBM). The announcement stated the warhead had a variable yield "the explosive power of which is adjustable from tens kiloton to hundreds kiloton (sic) ... [and] which can be detonated even at high altitudes for super-powerful EMP attack". A later technical announcement called the device a "two-stage thermo-nuclear weapon" and stated experimental measurements were fully compatible with the design specification, and there had been no leakage of radioactive materials from the underground nuclear test.

Photographs of North Korean leader Kim Jong-un inspecting a device resembling a thermonuclear weapon warhead were released a few hours before the test.

Analysts have tended to give credence to North Korea's claim that it was a hydrogen bomb. 38 North made a revised estimate for the test yield at 250 kT, making it near the maximum-containable yield for the Punggye-ri test site.   Tom Plant, director of proliferation and nuclear policy at the Royal United Services Institute said, "The North Koreans do bluff sometimes, but when they make a concrete claim about their nuclear programme, more often than not it turns out to be true. ... I think the balance is in favour of it being a thermonuclear bomb rather than a conventional atom bomb."

Others have been skeptical that it was a completely successful test of a true hydrogen bomb as North Korea claimed. Determining whether it is a two-stage thermonuclear bomb or a fusion-boosted fission weapon may not be possible without radionucleide emission data. The yield estimates of less than 300 kT would be lower than any other nation's first test of a fusion-primary thermonuclear device, which would typically be in the 1000 kT range, while boosted fission weapons and variable-yield nuclear devices can be as low as hundreds of tons, but are not considered true hydrogen bombs; meanwhile the largest pure-fission bomb tested was Ivy King at 500 kT. An October 2 Scientific American article said the test was "estimated to have been a 160-kiloton detonation — far below an H-bomb's capabilities." Martin Navias of the Centre for Defence Studies at King's College London noted that the breakthroughs needed to get from a fission to a fusion device would have to be done by the North Koreans on their own – China, Russia, Pakistan, and Iran would not or could not help.

As of January 2018 there have been no official announcements from the United States confirming or contradicting the detonation of a hydrogen bomb. However, on 15 September 2017 John E. Hyten, head of U.S. Strategic Command, said, "When I look at a thing this size, I as a military officer assume that it's a hydrogen bomb."

Earthquake 

The nuclear test caused a 6.3 magnitude earthquake in Punggye, which resulted in the collapse of several civilian buildings. The explosion from the nuclear test triggered aftershocks within eight minutes, damaging structures in a nearby village. A dozen people were killed and more than 150 people were injured due to the earthquake. Among them several children who were killed when their school collapsed. The North Korean government received harsh criticism after being accused of not warning civilians of the nuclear test as several children were in school when the earthquake took place. The impact also hit local farmers.

Yield estimates 
On the day of the test the chief of the South Korean parliament's defense committee, Kim Young-Woo, stated the nuclear yield was equivalent to about 100 kilotons of TNT (100 kt): "The North's latest test is estimated to have a yield of up to 100 kilotons, though it is a provisional report."
The independent seismic monitoring agency NORSAR estimated that the blast had a yield of about 120 kilotons, based on a seismic magnitude of 5.8.

On 5 September, the Japanese government gave a yield estimate of about 160 kilotons, based on analysing Comprehensive Nuclear-Test-Ban Treaty Organization seismic data, replacing an early estimate of 70 kilotons.

On 6 September, an early assessment by U.S. Intelligence that the yield was 140 kilotons, with an undisclosed margin of error, was reported. On 13 September, U.S. Intelligence was reported referring to an early yield estimate range of 70 to 280 kilotons made by the Air Force Technical Applications Center.

On 12 September, NORSAR revised its estimate of the earthquake magnitude upward to 6.1, matching that of the CTBTO, but less powerful than the USGS estimate of 6.3. Its yield estimate was revised to 250 kilotons, while noting the estimate had some uncertainty and an undisclosed margin of error.

On 13 September, an analysis of before and after synthetic-aperture radar satellite imagery of the test site was published suggesting the test occurred under  of rock and the yield "could have been in excess of 300 kilotons".

In October 2019 a paper by the Indian Space Research Organization was published using satellite interferometric synthetic-aperture radar data to analyse surface deformations using Bayesian modelling to reduce uncertainties.  It found that the explosion depth was 542 ± 30 metres below Mount Mantap, and the yield was 245–271 kilotons.

Reactions 
The United Nations Security Council met in an open emergency meeting on 4 September 2017, at the request of the US, South Korea, Japan, France and the UK.

Canada, China, Indonesia, Japan, Malaysia, the Philippines, Russia, Singapore, South Korea, and the United States voiced strong criticism of the nuclear test.

US President Donald Trump wrote on Twitter: "North Korea has conducted a major nuclear test. Their words and actions continue to be very hostile and dangerous to the United States". Trump was asked whether the U.S. would attack North Korea and replied: "We'll see." Defense Secretary James Mattis warned North Korea that it would be met with a "massive military response" if it threatened the United States or its allies.

See also 

List of earthquakes in 2017
List of nuclear weapons tests
List of nuclear weapons tests of North Korea

References

External links 

Nuclear test
2017
September 2017 events in Asia
Underground nuclear weapons testing
2017 earthquakes